Steve Watson (born June 11, 1972) is an American actor.  He is best known for his role as the host of Discovery Channel's reality program Monster House (2003–2006). He appeared on Ice Road Truckers during the "after" special and currently serves as host of HGTV's Don't Sweat It (2006–2011).

External links

HGTV Don't Sweat It

1972 births
American television personalities
People from Chattanooga, Tennessee
Living people
21st-century American male actors